Ernest Quost (February 24, 1842 in Avallon (Yonne) – March 24, 1931 in Paris was a French Impressionist painter .

Biography

Quost was a painter of animated cityscapes, landscapes, still lifes, flowers, fruit and pastels. He was probably a pupil of Horace Aumont (1839-1864) during his stay in Paris. He began at the Paris Salon in 1866, continued to expose the French artists Salon medalist in 1880, 1882 an associate in 1887, silver medalist in the Exposition Universelle (1889). Knighted in the Legion of Honour in 1883, and officer in 1903.

Ernest Quost is a "painter of Paris", the bustling boulevards, and dances. He first made many sketches, then painted in the workshop where he was a student of Pierre Eugène Montézin. Claude Monet appreciated flowers by Quost, and Van Gogh wrote in a letter to his brother Theo,  "the hollyhocks belong to Quost".

References

 
 
 Ernest Quost biography | Julian Simon Fine Art

1842 births
1931 deaths
19th-century French painters
French male painters
20th-century French painters
20th-century French male artists
Painters from Paris
French Impressionist painters
Burials in France
19th-century French male artists